Neten Chokling Rinpoche, also referred as to the Fourth Neten Chokling Rinpoche, is a Tibetan actor.

Life
Neten Chokling was born on August 10, 1973, in a farming family in Wangdue Phodrang, in Bhutan. He was recognized by the 16th Karmapa and Dilgo Khyentse Rinpoche as being the reincarnation of Neten Chokling Pema Gyurme. At the age of four,he was taken to his monastery — the Pema Ewam Chögar Gyurme Ling Monastery — in Bir, India, and enthroned by Dilgo Khyentse Rinpoche in Clement Town at the Ngedön Gatsal Ling monastery. Before arriving in his home monastery, Rinpoche was also enthroned in Rumtek by H.H. Karmapa who gave him the name Rigdzin Gyurme Dorje. He has received the transmissions of the Kangyur, Nyingma Gyübum, Nyingma Kama, Rinchen Terdzö and Chokling Tersar as well as many other teachings from Dilgo Khyentse Rinpoche. Orgyen Tobgyal Rinpoche, one of the sons of the previous Neten Chokling Rinpoche, participated in the education of his father's reincarnation before transferring to him the full responsibility of his monastery in 2004. 

Neten Chokling, along with Tsikey Chokling Rinpoche, is one of the four reincarnations of Chokgyur Lingpa. This lineage traces back to Trisong Detsen, a Tibetan king who invited Padmasambhava to Tibet.

Neten Chokling Rinpoche is married to Tenzing Choyang Gyari, the second oldest daughter of Gyari Rinpoche. Their son is Tulku Urgyen Yangsi Rinpoche.

Rinpoche acted in Dzongsar Khyentse Rinpoche's films The Cup (1999) and Travellers and Magicians (2003). In 2006, he directed his own film, The Life of Milarepa - Part I, about the adventurous years of the legendary Buddhist mystic, Milarepa (1052-1135), who is one of the best-known Tibetan saints, and who initially set out for vengeance and retribution.

References

External links
Milarepa movie official website
Milarepa movie blog
Neten Chokling Rinpoche

Tibetan male actors
Bhutanese male actors
Tibetan film directors
Rinpoches
1973 births
Living people
People from Wangdue Phodrang District